A New Year's levée is a social event on New Year's Day hosted by the Governor General of Canada, the lieutenant governors, military establishments, municipalities, and other institutions.

History

The word levée (from French, noun use of infinitive lever, "rising", from Latin levāre, "to raise") originated in the levée du soleil (rising of the sun) of King Louis XIV (1643–1715).  It was his custom to receive his male subjects in his bedchamber just after arising, a practice that subsequently spread throughout Europe.

In the 18th century the levée in Great Britain and Ireland became a formal court reception given by the sovereign or his/her representative in the forenoon or early afternoon. In the New World colonies the levee was held by the governor acting on behalf of the monarch. Only men were received at these events. Women were presented in the evening at court. 

It was in Canada that the levée became associated with New Year's Day. The fur traders had the tradition of paying their respects to the master of the fort (their government representative) on New Year's Day.  This custom was adopted by the governor general and lieutenant governors for their levées.

The first recorded levée in Canada was held on January 1, 1646, in the Château St. Louis by Charles Huault de Montmagny, Governor of New France from 1636 to 1648. In addition to wishing a happy new year to the citizens the governor informed guests of significant events in France as well as the state of affairs within the colony. In turn, the settlers were expected to renew their pledges of allegiance to the Crown.

The levée tradition was continued by British colonial governors in Canada and subsequently by both the governor general and lieutenant governors. It continues to the present day.

As mentioned, the levée was historically a male preserve but during World War II levées were attended by female officers of the armed forces. Since then levees have been open to both women and men.

Present day

Over the years, New Year's levées have become almost solely a Canadian observance, although kinds of levées still exist in other countries.

Today, levées are the receptions (usually, but not necessarily, on New Year's Day) held by the governor-general, the lieutenant governors of the provinces, the military and others, to mark the start of another year and to provide an opportunity for the public to pay their respects.

Most levées may be attended by any citizen, including children.
Attending the lieutenant governor's levée is an annual ritual for some families.

Today the levée has evolved from the earlier, more boisterous party into a more sedate and informal one.  It is an occasion to call upon representatives of the monarch, military and municipal governments and to exchange New Year's greetings and best wishes for the new year, to renew old acquaintances and to meet new friends. It is also an opportunity to reflect upon the events of the past year and to welcome the opportunities of the New Year.

The province of Prince Edward Island maintains a more historical approach to celebrating levee day.  On New Year's Day, all Legions and bars are opened and offer moose milk (eggnog and rum) from the early morning until the late night.  Though there are still the formal receptions held at Government House and Province House, levée day is not only a formal event.  It is something that attracts a large number of Islanders, which is quite unusual in comparison to the other provinces where it has gradually become more subdued.  Prince Edward Island levées begin at 8 a.m.

The historic town of Niagara-on-the-Lake (the first capital of Upper Canada) holds a levée complete with firing of a cannon at Navy Hall (a historic building close to Fort George) The levée is well attended by townspeople and visitors. Toasts are made to the King, "our beloved Canada", the Canadian Armed Forces, veterans, "our fallen comrades", as well as "our American friends and neighbours" (this final toast would not have been made two centuries ago when the town was founded). Greetings are brought from all levels of government and it is a great community event.

Some religious leaders, such as the Bishop of the Anglican Diocese of Ontario, hold a levée on New Year's Day.

Refreshments

As has the levée itself, refreshments served at levées have undergone changes (both in importance and variety) over the years.

In colonial times, when the formalities of the levée had been completed, guests were treated to wine and cheeses from the homeland. Wines did not travel well during the long ocean voyage to Canada. To make the cloudy and somewhat sour wine more palatable it was heated with alcohol and spices.

This was then mixed with goat's milk and flavoured with nutmeg and cinnamon to produce an Anglicized version called "moose milk". Today's versions of moose milk, in addition to whisky (or rum) and spices may use a combination of eggnog and ice cream, as well as other alcoholic supplements. The exact recipes used by specific groups may be jealously guarded secrets.

Refreshments were clearly an important element in the New Year's festivities. A report of the New Year's levée held in Brandon House in Manitoba in 1797 indicated that "... in the morning the Canadians (men of the North West Company) make the House and Yard ring with saluting (the firing of rifles). The House then filled with them when they all got a dram each." Simpson's Athabasca Journal reports that on January 1, 1821, "'' the Festivities of the New Year commenced at four o'clock this morning when the people honored me with a salute of firearms, and in half an hour afterward the whole Inmates of our Garrison assembled in the hall dressed out in their best clothes, and were regaled in a suitable manner with a few flagon's Rum and some Cakes. A full allowance of Buffaloe meat was served out to them and a pint of spirits for each man; the Women were also entertained to the utmost of our ability.'"

When residents called upon the governor to pay their respects they expected a party. In 1856 on Vancouver Island, there was "an almighty row" when the colonial governor's level was not to the attendees' liking.

Municipalities with levées

 Ajijic, Jalisco, Mexico
 Almonte, Ontario
   
 Bracebridge, Ontario
 Brampton, Ontario
 Brantford, Ontario
 Brockville, Ontario
 Cannington, Ontario
 Cape Breton Regional Municipality, Nova Scotia
 Cambridge, Ontario
 Cobourg, Ontario
 Collingwood, Ontario
 Charlottetown, Prince Edward Island
 Grand Manan, New Brunswick
 Edmonton, Alberta - Not a municipal event: hosted by the lieutenant governor 
 Elliot Lake, Ontario
 Esquimalt, British Columbia
 Georgina, Ontario
 Guelph, Ontario
 Hubbards, Nova Scotia
 Halifax, Nova Scotia
 Hamilton, Ontario
 Kentville, Nova Scotia
 Kingston, Ontario
 Kitchener, Ontario
 Langford, British Columbia
 London, Ontario
 Lunenburg, Nova Scotia
 Medicine Hat, Alberta
 Milton, Ontario
 Mississauga, Ontario
 Moncton, New Brunswick
 Montreal, Quebec
 Niagara-on-the-Lake, Ontario
 North Saanich, British Columbia
 North Dumfries Township, Ontario
 Oak Bay, British Columbia
 Oakville, Ontario
 Orangeville, Ontario
 Oshawa, Ontario
 Owen Sound, Ontario
 Town of Parrsboro, Nova Scotia Canada until 2012 
 Pictou, Nova Scotia
 Picton, Ontario
 Pinware, Labrador
 Port Colborne, Ontario
 Port Hope, Ontario
 Redwater, Alberta
 Regina, Saskatchewan
 Rivers, Manitoba
 Riverview, New Brunswick
 Saanich, British Columbia
 Shelburne, Nova Scotia
 Sioux Lookout, Ontario
 Sooke, British Columbia
 St. Catharines, Ontario
 Stellarton, Nova Scotia
 Stewiacke, Nova Scotia
 Summerside, Prince Edward Island
 Thunder Bay, Ontario
 Toronto, Ontario
 Trenton, Ontario
 Vaughan, Ontario - Used to be hosted by the Federal Government's MP, now municipal event since 2023.
 Victoria, British Columbia
 Waterloo, Ontario
 Windsor, Ontario
 Winnipeg, Manitoba
 Woodstock, New Brunswick
 Yarmouth, Nova Scotia

Military levées

The levée has a long tradition in the Canadian Forces as one of the activities associated with New Year's Day. Military commanders garrisoned throughout Canada held local levées since, as commissioned officers, they were expected to act on behalf of the Crown on such occasions.

On Vancouver Island (the base for the Royal Navy's Pacific Fleet), levées began in the 1840s.

Today, members of the various Canadian Forces units and headquarters
across Canada receive and greet visiting military and civilian guests
on the first day of the new year.

In military messes, refreshments take a variety of forms: moose milk (with rum often substituted for whisky); the special flaming punch of the Royal Canadian Hussars of Montreal; the Atholl Brose of the Seaforth Highlanders of Vancouver; "Little Black Devils", (Dark Rum and Crème de menthe) of the Royal Winnipeg Rifles.  Members of Le Régiment de Hull use sabres to uncork bottles of champagne.

Fictional references

In literary fiction, levées form an important background to plot development in Neal Stephenson's Baroque Cycle trilogy.

Notes

External links
Roberts, J. Michael: New Year's Day Levée, 1997.
Google Search for "Canada New Year's Day Levée
Moose Milk Recipes at Cooks.com
Levee in Hamilton, Ontario

State ritual and ceremonies
New Year celebrations
Military traditions
Moose milk (cocktail)